Grünbach is a river of Baden-Württemberg, Germany. It passes through Grünsfeld and flows into the Tauber near Lauda-Königshofen.

See also
List of rivers of Baden-Württemberg

References

Rivers of Baden-Württemberg
Rivers of Germany